Artur Jan Woźniak (born 10 November 1913 in Kraków, died 31 May 1991 in Kraków), was a Polish football forward, twice top scorer of the Polish First Division.

For most of his career, Woźniak was loyal to Wisła Kraków, where he played in the years 1931 – 1947, scoring 102 goals in 140 games, and three times becoming vice-champion of the country (1931, 1936, 1947). In 1933 and 1937, Woźniak was top scorer of the Ekstraklasa, with 18 and 12 goals.

During World War II, he was captured by the Nazi German occupiers, and sent to Mauthausen-Gusen concentration camp. After the war, Woźniak remained in Wisła until 1947, then moving to the Recovered Territories, to the newly created club Orzeł Ząbkowice. Then, he became a coach, working with a number of Polish teams, such as ŁKS Łódź, Garbarnia Kraków, Lech Poznań, Zawisza Bydgoszcz, Ruch Chorzów, Zagłębie Sosnowiec, Śląsk Wrocław and Wisła Kraków (1956–1957).

In the mid-1930s, he capped five times for Poland, without scoring a goal.

References

1913 births
1991 deaths
Polish footballers
Poland international footballers
Footballers from Kraków
Wisła Kraków players
Ekstraklasa players
Polish football managers
ŁKS Łódź managers
Lech Poznań managers
Wisła Kraków managers
MKS Cracovia managers
Ruch Chorzów managers
Śląsk Wrocław managers
Mauthausen concentration camp survivors
Odra Opole managers
Zagłębie Sosnowiec managers
Association football forwards